Simone Bocchino (born 18 September 1978), also known by his stagenames DJ Satomi, Neuroxyde, and Aki Bergen, is an Italian sound engineer, composer and producer, who at age 14 used his passion for the European techno movement as inspiration to start exploring the international club scene.

Career 
Bocchino started off within his local music scene and in 1997 met Andrea Prezioso, who became his “precious” mentor for a few years and helped instigate Bocchino's first production. In that year, he and Prezioso wrote a single, Simon Templar - Electricity. In 2002 he opened his first professional studio. In 2003, he signed with Ipnotika Records and the next year wrote Castle in the Sky. This song was highly successful and has been included in many compilations. He later produced the singles Waves and Nuclear Sun. In 2007 he won a 'Gold Disk' in France and shortly afterwards, Starlight Music was launched, featuring collaborations with artists such as Shara Nelson from Massive Attack, D.O.N.S. and Dubfire.

Bocchino's next step was to launch a new label, Neurotraxx. Bocchino collaborated with  artists including Dannii Minogue, Ralphi Rosario, Oscar G, Miguel Migs, Goldfish, Noir, Rah Band, Honey Dijon, and Moonbeam. Bocchino also extended himself by giving lessons/lectures on mixing and post-production at universities and several other renowned musical schools. In 2014 he undertook a string of new projects alongside Steyoyoke Recordings in the pipeline.

Simone's debut single, "Castle in the Sky", has been viewed over 20 million times on YouTube since it was uploaded on 1 December 2007.

Discography

Compilation albums

Singles
"Castle in the Sky"
"Waves"
"Nuclear Sun"
"Wonderland"
"Fantasy"
"Superstar"
"Save Me"
"Lost in Space"
"With You"
"Hung Up"
"Little Chance"

References

External links
DJ Satomi on iTunes

21st-century Italian musicians
Italian electronic musicians
Living people
1978 births
Musicians from Rome